Bassaniana utahensis is a species of spider of the genus Bassaniana, the bark crab spiders. It is native to Canada and the United States.

References

Thomisidae
Spiders described in 1932
Spiders of North America